Ibarra (which means alluvial plain in Basque) may refer to:

Places 
 Ibarra Canton, Ecuador
 Ibarra, Ecuador, the capital of Imbabura Province and the canton
 Roman Catholic Diocese of Ibarra, inside the city
 Ibarra, Gipuzkoa, a locality in Gipuzkoa, Spain
 Ibarra Peak, Victoria Land, Antarctica

Other uses 
 Ibarra (surname)
 Ibarra (chocolate), a brand of Mexican-style chocolate
 UD Ibarra, a Spanish football team based in Arona, Tenerife
 Juan Crisóstomo Ibarra y Magsalin, commonly referred as "Ibarra" or "Crisóstomo", the protagonist of the Philippine novel Noli Me Tángere by José Rizal

See also
 Ybarra, a surname